Callionymus sereti, Séret’s dragonet, is a species of dragonet endemic to the Pacific Ocean around Futuna Island where it occurs at depths of from . The specific name honours Bernard Séret, an ichthyologist at the Muséum National d'Histoire Naturelle in France.

References 

S
Fish described in 1998